Lac-des-Îles Water Aerodrome  was located on Lac-des-Îles, Quebec, Canada. It was open from May until November.

References

Defunct seaplane bases in Quebec